Javadzadeh is a surname. Notable people with the surname include:

Nesrin Javadzadeh (born 1982), Turkish actress of Azeri origin
Samir Javadzadeh (born 1980), Azerbaijani pop singer